Fereej Bin Durham (also spelled as Fereej bin Derhem) is a district in Qatar, located in the municipality of Ad Dawhah. Together with Al Mansoura, it makes up Zone 25 which has a total population of 37,082.

The district is in close proximity to Doha's business center and logistics focal points on the east coast, such as Hamad International Airport and Grand Hamad Street, making it a popular choice for commercial operators to set up in. It is also relatively close to some of Doha's major population centers such as Mushayrib. Bin Dirham Plaza, developed by Just Real Estate, is one such major project to capitalize on Fereej Bin Durham's location, having launched as a major 7-storey office project in 2017.

Landmarks
Ansar Gallery on Al Bukhari Street. Ansar Group established the Ansar Gallery Supercenter in October 2011, over an area of 30,000 square feet.
Qatar Billiards and Snooker Federation on Rawdat Al Khail Street.
Al Muntazah Plaza Hotel on Rawdat Al Khail Street.
QatarEnergy office on B Ring Road.

Education
The following school is located in Fereej Bin Durham:

References

Communities in Doha